Dzintars Jaundžeikars (14 February 1956 – 16 March 2022) was a Latvian politician. He was a member of the LPP/LC and a deputy of the 8th and 9th Saeima (Latvian Parliament). He began his last term in parliament on 16 November 2006, until he was voted out in 2010 Latvian parliamentary election. Jaundžeikars was also Minister of the Interior of Latvia from 3 November 2005 to 7 November 2006. Jaundžeikars died on 16 March 2022, at the age of 66.

References

External links
 Saeima website

1956 births
2022 deaths
Latvian National Independence Movement politicians
Latvia's First Party politicians
Latvia's First Party/Latvian Way politicians
Ministers of the Interior of Latvia
Deputies of the 8th Saeima
Deputies of the 9th Saeima
Latvia University of Life Sciences and Technologies alumni